is a Japanese women's professional shogi player ranked 2-dan.

Promotion history
Yamada's promotion history is as follows.
 2-kyū: April 1, 2000
 1-kyū: April 1, 2001
 1-dan: April 1, 2003
 2-dan: March 5, 2009

Note: All ranks are women's professional ranks.

References

External links
 ShogiHub: Yamada, Akemi

Japanese shogi players
Living people
Women's professional shogi players
1980 births
People from Okayama Prefecture
Professional shogi players from Okayama Prefecture